Hibbertia fitzgeraldensis is a species of flowering plant in the family Dilleniaceae and is endemic to a restricted area in the south-west of Western Australia. It is a sprawling shrub with sometimes clustered linear leaves and yellow flowers borne on the ends of short side shoots, with eleven stamens in groups surrounding the three carpels.

Description
There are eleven stamens with nine in groups of three, around the three carpels, each carpel containing a single ovule. Flowering occurs in September and October.

Taxonomy
Hibbertia fitzgeraldensis was first formally described in 2002 by Judy Wheeler in the journal Nuytsia from specimens she collected on West Mount Barren in 1986. The specific epithet (fitzgeraldensis) is a reference to the Fitzgerald River National Park where this species occurs.

Distribution and habitat
This hibbertia grows in heath, often on rocky slopes or hills in the Fitzgerald River National Park in the south-west of Western Australia.

Conservation status
Hibbertia fitzgeraldensis is classified as "Priority Three" by the Government of Western Australia Department of Parks and Wildlife meaning that it is poorly known and known from only a few locations but is not under imminent threat.

See also
List of Hibbertia species

References

fitzgeraldensis
Flora of Western Australia
Plants described in 2002